The Donation of Pepin in 756 provided a legal basis for the creation of the Papal States, thus extending the temporal rule of the popes beyond the duchy of Rome.

Background
In 751, Aistulf, king of the Lombards, conquered what remained of the exarchate of Ravenna, the last vestige of the Roman Empire in northern Italy. In 752, Aistulf demanded the submission of Rome and a tribute of one gold solidus per capita. Pope Stephen II and a Roman envoy, the silentiary John, tried through negotiations and bribes to convince Aistulf to back down. When this failed, Stephen led a solemn procession through the streets of Rome and nailed the treaty which Aistulf had violated to a crucifix. He then sent envoys to Pepin the Short, king of the Franks, with a letter requesting his support and the provision of a Frankish escort so that Stephen could go to Pepin to confer. At the time, the Franks were on good terms with the Lombards.

In 753, John the Silentiary returned from Constantinople to Rome with an imperial order (iussio) that Pope Stephen accompany him to meet Aistulf in the Lombard capital of Pavia. The pope duly requested and received a letter of transit from the Lombards. With the Frankish envoys who had by then arrived, the pope and the imperial envoy set out for Pavia on 14 October 753. The Roman magnates did not accompany them past the border of the duchy of Rome. At Pavia, Aistulf denied the requests of Stephen and John to return the conquered exarchate to the empire, but he did not prevent Stephen from continuing with the Frankish envoys to the court of Pepin. They left Pavia on 15 November 753. John the Silentiary did not accompany them. This was the first time a pope had crossed the Alps. The decision to act independently of the imperial envoy was of the immense moment. It is likely that the pope saw himself as acting on behalf of the Italian province subjugated and threatened by Aistulf.

Original promise
Pope Stephen met Pepin the Short at the royal estate at Ponthion on 6 January 754. The king led the Pope's horse, while the pope in sackcloth and ashes bowed down and asked Pepin "that in accordance with the peace treaties [between Rome and the Lombards] he would support the suit of St Peter and of the republic of the Romans". Pepin responded by promising "to restore the exarchate of Ravenna and the rights and territories of the republic". The exact nature of this commitment cannot be known, but it is unlikely that Pepin had in mind the Roman Empire. It has been suggested that the two parties exchanged oaths on this occasion, but that is unlikely.

Over the next two years, Pepin dispatched three embassies to Aistulf demanding that he honour his treaties with the Romans. In April 754, he held a general assembly at Quierzy-sur-Oise. Some noblemen left the proceedings in opposition to the policy, but Pepin restated publicly his promise to the Pope and enumerated the territories that he would restore. Afterwards, this promise was put into writing.  On 28 July in the Basilica of Saint-Denis, the Pope anointed Pepin and his sons Charles and Carloman as kings of the Franks and patricians of the Romans . He also pronounced a blessing on Queen Bertrada and the assembled nobility. The pope's right to grant the patrician title is doubtful.

Military actions
In the spring of 755, Pepin summoned the army to muster at Braisne-sur-Vesle. He sent envoys ahead to offer Aistulf an indemnity if he restored the Roman territories he had taken in violation of his treaties. The Frankish army crossed the Mont Cénis and defeated the Lombard army near Susa. Defeated, Aistulf submitted to some form of Frankish overlordship and promised under oath to return Ravenna and the other cities he had occupied to the Pope. The peace treaty was signed by the "Romans, Franks, and Lombards" without direct reference to the Empire. 

As soon as the Frankish army left Italy, Aistulf disregarded the treaty. On 1 January 756, he put Rome under siege. The Pope appealed to the Franks. After three months, Aistulf abandoned the blockade. In April, a Frankish army invaded Italy again and defeated the Lombards. Aistulf was forced to give hostages and pay annual tribute to the Franks. He also had to promise in writing to return the occupied territories to the Pope.

Final agreement
The treaty officially conferred upon the pope the territories belonging to Ravenna, even cities such as Forlì with their hinterlands, the Lombard conquests in the Romagna and in the Duchy of Spoleto and Benevento, and the Pentapolis (the "five cities" of Rimini, Pesaro, Fano, Senigallia and Ancona). Narni and Ceccano were former papal territories. The territories specified in the treaty of 756 had belonged to the Roman Empire. Envoys of the Empire met Pepin in Pavia and offered him a large sum of money to restore the lands to the Empire, but he refused, saying that they belonged to St Peter and the Roman church. The exact boundaries of the grant to the Pope can only be approximated, since the text of the treaty does not survive. It is possible that the boundaries were the same as those in a previous Imperial–Lombard treaty. Abbot Fulrad was charged with collecting the keys of the cities to be handed over and depositing them along with the written agreement on the tomb of St Peter.

The Donations made the Pope a temporal ruler for the first time. This strip of territory extended diagonally across Italy from the Tyrrhenian to the Adriatic. Over these extensive and mountainous territories the medieval Popes were unable to exercise effective sovereignty, given the pressures of the times.

Charlemagne
In 774 Pepin's son Charlemagne visited Rome and again confirmed and reasserted the Donation. Some later chronicles falsely claimed that he also expanded them, granting Tuscany, Emilia, Venice and Corsica.

See also
 Donation of Constantine, a forged Roman imperial decree by which the 4th-century emperor Constantine the Great supposedly transferred authority over Rome and the western part of the Roman Empire to the Pope.

References

Sources

Foreign relations of the Holy See
History of the papacy
Papal States
756
8th century in the Papal States